Sticky toffee pudding, also known as sticky date pudding in Australia and New Zealand, is a British dessert consisting of a moist sponge cake, made with finely chopped dates (optional), covered in a toffee sauce and often served with a vanilla custard or vanilla ice-cream. It is considered a British classic by various culinary experts.

Composition
A sticky toffee pudding has two essential components. The first is a moist sponge cake, containing finely chopped dates. The sponge is usually light and fluffy, closer to a muffin consistency rather than a heavier traditional British sponge, and is often lightly flavoured with nuts or spices such as cloves. The date component is, however, optional. The second key element is the toffee sauce, usually made from double cream and then different dark sugars, depending on recipe.

A sticky toffee pudding is most commonly served with custard or vanilla ice cream, the vanilla flavour of these complimenting the richer flavours of the pudding. It may also be served with single cream.

Origins
The origins of sticky toffee pudding are disputed. Owners of several pubs, including the Gait Inn in Millington, East Riding of Yorkshire (claimed to 1907) and the Udny Arms Hotel in Newburgh, Aberdeenshire (1960s), claim to have invented it.

The pudding was popularised in the 1970s by Francis Coulson and Robert Lee, who developed and served it at the Sharrow Bay Country House Hotel in Cumbria The food critic Simon Hopkinson said Coulson told him he received the recipe from a Patricia Martin of Claughton in Lancashire, and that Martin had received this from Canadian air force officers who lodged at her hotel during the Second World War.

References

External links

 Rock Recipes Perfect English Sticky Toffee Pudding Recipe
 A Tasty Sticky Toffee Pudding Recipe to Make at Home

British desserts
British puddings
English cuisine
English inventions
Australian desserts
New Zealand desserts
Steamed foods